101 California Street is a 48-story office skyscraper completed in 1982 in the Financial District of San Francisco, California. The  tower, providing  of office space, is bounded by California, Davis, Front, and Pine Streets near Market Street.

History
Singapore sovereign wealth fund bought 92% of the building from Nippon Life Insurance Company in 2012 for US$910 million. Hines Interests Limited Partnership has a partial stake in the building.

Description
The faceted cylindrical tower features a seven-story, glass-enclosed lobby and a granite plaza with flower beds and a fountain. During the holiday season, a platform with many oversized Christmas ornaments is added to the plaza. The building's entrance is very similar to that of 101 Park Avenue in New York City, and was also designed by Philip Johnson and John Burgee in 1982.

101 California is equipped with a total of thirty-two elevators, with twenty-two serving the tower; two serving floors 45 through 48; four serving the triangular annex building; two serving the garage; and two for freight. The eight stairwells throughout the building are intended for emergency use only.

1993 shooting
The building is the site of what has become known as the 101 California Street shootings, a mass murder which occurred there in 1993.  On July 1, Gian Luigi Ferri, a disgruntled client of the law firm Pettit & Martin, entered their offices on the 34th floor and killed eight people and wounded six before killing himself. The event was a catalyst in the passage of the Violent Crime Control and Law Enforcement Act of 1994, a drive initiated by California Senator Dianne Feinstein to ban "assault weapons".  A terraced garden in the plaza in front of the building is now dedicated to the victims.

Notable tenants
 Booz & Company
 CBRE Group
 Beazley Group
 Susquehanna International Group
 Merrill Lynch
 Venable LLP
 Cooley LLP
 Deutsche Bank
 Morgan Stanley
 Winston & Strawn
 The Blackstone Group 
 Business Wire
 Invesco
 Jefferies Group
 Grant Thornton LLP

Gallery

See also

 San Francisco's tallest buildings

References

Further reading

External links
  101 California property website
 101 California  at Hines Interests Limited Partnership

Office buildings completed in 1982
Hines Interests Limited Partnership
John Burgee buildings
Philip Johnson buildings
Skyscraper office buildings in San Francisco
Financial District, San Francisco
1982 establishments in California
Leadership in Energy and Environmental Design platinum certified buildings